Bachelor Daddy is a 1941 American comedy film directed by Harold Young and written by Robert Lees and Frederic I. Rinaldo. The film stars Baby Sandy, Edward Everett Horton, Donald Woods, Raymond Walburn, Evelyn Ankers, Kathryn Adams Doty, Franklin Pangborn and Jed Prouty. The film was released on June 4, 1941, by Universal Pictures.

Plot

When Eleanor Pierce is arrested for selling homemade candy without a license, she sends a letter to "Mr. Smith" at the Bachelor's Club asking him to take care of "their" daughter. The Smith brothers, Joseph and George, accuse their brother Edward of being the father of the child, but they all show up at Eleanor's apartment to take charge of Sandy. Eleanor is released on her own recognizance and returns to claim her daughter, but when she sees the good care Sandy is receiving from her new "uncles" she decides Sandy might be better off with them. The brothers hire Eleanor as Sandy's nursemaid, and Edward Smith immediately falls for Eleanor, who eventually reveals that she is Sandy's mother. Edward and Eleanor sneak off, taking Sandy with them.

Cast
Baby Sandy as Sandy 
Edward Everett Horton as Joseph Smith
Donald Woods as Edward Smith
Raymond Walburn as George Smith
Evelyn Ankers as Beth Chase
Kathryn Adams Doty as Eleanor Pierce
Franklin Pangborn as Williams
Jed Prouty as C. J. Chase
Hardie Albright as Ethelbert
George Meader as Judge McGinnis
Bert Roach as Louie
Leonard Elliott as Clark
Juanita Quigley as Girl 
Bobby Larson as Boy 
Mira McKinney as Landlady

References

External links
 

1941 films
American comedy films
1941 comedy films
Universal Pictures films
Films directed by Harold Young (director)
American black-and-white films
1940s English-language films
1940s American films